Aldo Dipetta (born 3 January 1972) is a former Australian rules footballer who played with St Kilda and the Sydney Swans in the Australian Football League (AFL).

Dipette played his early football with the Springvale Football Club and at Mazenod College.

He made three appearances for St Kilda late in the 1990 AFL season, didn't feature at all in 1991, then played another two league games in 1992.

In 1993 he moved to the ACT and began playing with Ainslie, from where he was drafted to the Sydney Swans, with pick 16 of the 1993 Mid-Season Draft. He played twice for the Swans in 1993.

He played over 100 games with Ainslie until his final season in 2001.

He is now a podiatrist in Canberra.

References

1972 births
Living people
Australian rules footballers from Victoria (Australia)
St Kilda Football Club players
Sydney Swans players
Casey Demons players
Ainslie Football Club players
Sportspeople from Canberra
Australian rules footballers from the Australian Capital Territory
Australian podiatrists